Croatia participated in the Junior Eurovision Song Contest 2004. The Croatian broadcaster Hrvatska radiotelevizija (HRT) organised an national final to select the entry, being Nika Turković with the song "Hej mali".

Before Junior Eurovision

Dječja Pjesma Eurovizije 2004 
Dječja Pjesma Eurovizije 2004 was the second edition of the Croatian national selection, which selected Croatia's entry for the Junior Eurovision Song Contest 2004.

Competing entries 
Artists and composers were able to submit their entries to the broadcaster. 100 entries were received by the broadcaster during the submission period. An expert committee consisting of Sandra Bagarić, Josip Cvitanović, Rajko Dujmić, Mladen Kušec, Marin Margitić and Maja Vučić selected twelve artists and songs for the competition from the received submissions.

Final 
The final took place on 25 September 2004. All the songs were accompanied by a symphony orchestra, and the winner was determined by a public televote. Only the top four places was announced.

At Junior Eurovision

Voting

References

Croatia
Junior
Junior Eurovision Song Contest